Harold Dickinson (8 August 1908 – 29 April 1988) was an Australian rules footballer who played with Essendon in the Victorian Football League (VFL).

Notes

External links 
		

1908 births
1988 deaths
Australian rules footballers from Victoria (Australia)
Essendon Football Club players
Cobram Football Club players